Arnold Busck, named after founder Arnold Busck, is a family-owned Danish company with activities in book distribution and publishing. The Arnold Busck chain of bookstores is one of the largest Danish book retailers with 30 stores.

It went bankrupt on 27 April 2020, during the coronavirus pandemic. 14 of its bookstores were bought by Bog & Idé, while the Arnold Busck brand and it most well-known store in Købmagergade, Copenhagen were bought by JP/Politikens Forlag, owned by JP/Politikens Hus.

History
The company was founded in Copenhagen as Busck & Wisbech by Arnold Busck and J. L. Wisbech in 1896. The first bookshop was located on Pilestræde but moved to larger premises on Gothersgade at No. 49 in 1901. The company changed its name to Arnold Busck after Wisbech left the company in 1902.

In 1922 Arnold Busck acquired Nyt Nordisk Forlag and in 1965 Det Schønbergske Forlag.

In 1941, Arnold Busck's son, Helge Arnold Busck, took over the position as XEO of the company. He was succeeded by his son Ole Arnold Busck in 1969.

Company

The chain consists of 30 bookstores, including a flagship store over three storeys at its historical home at Købmagergade 49 in Copenhagen which also contains a Baresso coffee shop. The current CEO is Helle Busck Fensvig, 4th generation of the Busck family.

Bookstores
 Metropolitan Copenhagen (17)
 Ballerup
 Birkerød
 Copenhagen (4)
 Købmagergade
 Statens Museum for Kunst
 Valby
 Hellerup (2)
 Strandvejen
 Waterfront Shopping
 Helsinge
 Helsingør (3)
 Espergærde
 Helsingør Bycenter
 Stengade
 Hundige
 Køge
 Kongens Lyngby
 Rødovre
 Roskilde

 Lolland-Falster
 Nykøbing Falster

 Funen (3)
 Odense (2)
 Rosengårdcentret
 Vestergade
 Svendborg

 Jutland (12)
 Aalborg (3)
 Bispensgade
 Friis
 Aalborg Storcenter
 Esbjerg
 Haderslev
 Herning
 Hjørring
 Holstebro
 Kolding
 Randers
 Sønderborg
 Vejle

References

External links 

 

Publishing companies of Denmark
Retail companies based in Copenhagen
Mass media companies based in Copenhagen
Danish companies established in 1896